Eskatrol was an amphetamine weight loss agent which was removed by the U.S. 
 Food and Drug Administration (FDA) in 1981 after its manufacturer,  SmithKline & French (SKF), failed to prove the therapeutic effectiveness (Emax) of the medication. At the time it was among the 200 most widely prescribed drugs in the United States. Others included Dexamyl and Desbutal pills. Eskatrol contained dextroamphetamine sulfate (Dexedrine) and prochlorperazine (Compazine), a typical antipsychotic.

In August 1970, the FDA sought to limit the use of stimulants by calling for changes in labeling which decreased the number of allowable claims and intensified the warnings about possible hazards. The FDA Commissioner, Charles C. Edwards, criticized the pharmaceutical industry for not helping to prevent the  drug abuse of amphetamines. Thomas M. Rauch, president of SKF Laboratories, responded that his company had long promoted stricter abuse legislation and tighter controls on production and distribution. SKF also manufactured dextroamphetamine sulfate (Dexedrine) and racemic amphetamine sulfate (Benzedrine) pills. The FDA then established restrictions onto amphetamine treatment claims by manufacturers, limiting the total number of amphetamine indications to only three medical uses. These were specified to be the two rare conditions of narcolepsy and hyperactivity with the third permitted indication being for appetite suppression among obese patients. However, usage of amphetamines as  anorectic agents will only be indicated for short-term obesity treatment not to exceed a few weeks.

Jimmy Buffett references Eskatrol in his song "Fool Button," stating that mixing it with a bottle of rum will enable one to act foolishly to have a good time.

See also
 Benzedrine
 Desbutal
 Dexamyl
 D-IX
 Jeffrey R. MacDonald, a former American medical doctor and United States Army captain who was convicted in August 1979 of murdering his pregnant wife and two daughters in February 1970 while serving as an Army Special Forces physician. Alleged to have regularly taken Eskatrol in an effort to lose weight via a weight-control program for his Green Beret unit.

References

Withdrawn drugs
Substituted amphetamines